Panuganti Lakshmi Narasimharaavu (Telugu - పానుగంటి లక్ష్మీ నరసింహా రావు)  (11 February 1865 – 1 January 1940) was one of the popular modern Telugu writers. He was born at Seetanagaram, Rajamundry, Andhra Pradesh. After his education, he became a teacher in Peddapuram High School. Later he moved to Pitahpuram as 'Asthana Kavi' for the Pitahpuram Rajah's kingdom.

He brought essays into prominence in Telugu literature. He is popularly known as "Andhra Shakespeare" and "Andhra Edison". He was awarded 'Abhinava Kalidas' by Venkata Sastry. He was one of the three famous writers of those days - Chilakamarthy Lakshmi Narasimham, Koochi Narasimham and Panuganti Lakshmi Narasimham - popularly known as 'Simha Trayam'.

Literary works
Sri Vishnu Naama Maala Strotram (1899)
Narmada Purukutsiyam (1902)
Saarangadhara (1904)
Radhakrishna (1904): It is based on the tenets of Gaudiya Vaishnavism. He was inspired to write this play by Ashutosh Mukherji's Lord Gouranga. The play depicts the stages of development of Radha's simple bhakti growing into Mahabhava, its highest culmination usually associated with only Radha by vaishnava scholars. It is sought to elevate the image of Radha to Krishna's consort in Goloka, the heaven. The Sage Narada was used as an initiator and promoter of this dramatic action.
Prachanda Chanakyamu (1909)
Pattabhanga Raghavamu or Paadukaa Pattabhishekhamu (1909)
Kokila (1909)
Vijaya Raghavamu (1909)
Vanavasa Raghavamu (1909)
Vyjayanthi Vilasamu or Vipranaaraayana Charitra (1909)
Buddha Bodha Sudha (1910)
Vruddha Vivahamu (1910)
Mano Mahima (1911)
Saakshi (1913-1914; 1920-1922; 1927-1928; 1933)
Kalyana Raaghavamu (1915)
Kanthaabharanamu (1917)
Kathalahari (1917)
Hasyavallari (1917)
Prakeershopanyasamulu (1918)
Saraswathi (1920)
Poornima (1922)
Mudrika (1923)
Veeramathi (1923)
Chudamani
Padmini (1929)
Malatheemala (1929)
Sarojini (1930)
Raati Sthambhamu (1930)
Vichitra Vivahamu (1931)
Gunavathi (1948)
Manimala (1948)
Subbaraju (1948)
Paraprema (1948)
Ramaraju (1948)
Chinna Natakamu (1948)

References

Kalyana Raghavamu: Panuganti Lakshmi Narasimha chary 1915.
Narmadapurukutsiyam: Panuganti Lakshmi Narasimha chary, 1973 .
Raathi Sthambhamu: Panuganti Lakshmi Narasimha chary 1930 .

Telugu writers
People from East Godavari district
1865 births
1940 deaths
Writers from Andhra Pradesh